Björn Gösta Tryggve Granath (5 April 1946 – 5 February 2017) was a Swedish actor who appeared in over 100 films and television shows. 
 
Granath was born in Örgryte, Gothenburg, Sweden. He starred in a broad range of roles from comedic to dramatic. He was active as an actor and director at the Royal Dramatic Theatre in Stockholm between the years 1987–2007. Prior to his passing he was set to play Buckingham in a production of Richard III at the Royal Dramatic Theatre. It was a revival of a popular production he had appeared in during 2014.

Granath was married to Ann-Margreth Fyrgård, and the couple had two children.

Awards
 The Eugene O'Neill Award, 2003
 Litteris et Artibus, 2000

Selected filmography

 Mistreatment (1969) - Björn
 Den magiska cirkeln (1970) - Hammarström
 Du gamla, du fria (1972) - Björn
 Du är inte klok, Madicken (1979) - Pappa
 Madicken på Junibacken (1980) - Pappa
 Svindlande affärer (1985) - Spelande affärsman
 Sällskapsresan 2 - Snowroller (1985) - Göte
 Demoner (1986) - Thomas
 Den frusna leoparden (1986) - Todd
 Min pappa är Tarzan (1986) - Skrothandlare
 Plastposen (1986) - Svensk seiler
 Mälarpirater (1987) - Father
 Los dueños del silencio (1987) - Editor
 Pelle the Conqueror (1987) - Erik
 Hunden som log (1989) - Rektorn
 Un paradiso senza biliardo (1991) - Administrator
 The Ox (1991) - Flyckt
 The Best Intentions (1992) - Oscar Åkerblom
 The Johnson Gang & the Black Diamond (1992) - Kommissarien
 Svart Lucia (1992) - Principal
 The Young Indiana Jones Chronicles (1993, TV Series) - Adler
 Pillertrillaren (1994) - Doctor
 Illusioner (1994) - Doctor
 A Life for the Taking (1995) - Björn Granath
 Vendetta (1995) - Bielke
 Poeten som slutade dikta (1995)
 Jerusalem (1996) - Storm
 The White Lioness (1996) - Björk
 Eye of the Eagle (1997) - Biskop Eskil
 Et hjørne af paradis (1997) - Professor Andersson
 Svenska hjältar (1997) - Ekonomen
 Synden är lömsk och listig (1997)
 Lithivm (1998) - Henrik Laurentsson
 Magnetisøren's femte vinter (1999) - Landshøvding Aspelin
 Sherdil (1999) - Arméchefen
 Faithless (2000) - Gustav
 Evert (2001)
 As White as in Snow (2001) - Sven Andersson
 Livet i 8 bitar (2002) - Ove
 Elina: As If I Wasn't There (2002) - Doctor
 Svidd neger (2003) - Presten
 Evil (2003) - Headmaster
 Tre solar (2004) - Vaktchefen
 Som man bäddar... (2005) - Olof
 Den utvalde (2005) - Erik Swahn
 Den enskilde medborgaren (2006) - Allan Dahlman
 Les Grandes Personnes (2008) - Pastor
 The Girl with the Dragon Tattoo (2009) - Gustav Morell
 Pax (2010) - Overlegen
 Sound of Noise (2010) - Hospital Manager
 The American (2010) - Hunter #2
 Nobels testamente (2012) - Ernst Ericsson
 The Last Sentence (2012) - Axel Forssman
 Den som söker (2013) - Eskil
 Her er Harold (2014) - Kamprad
 Så ock på jorden (2015) - Bjelke
 The Bridge (2015, TV Series) - Kjell
 Fallet (2017, TV Series) - Arne Arnesen
 Borg vs McEnroe (2017) - Bengt Grive
 Kingsman: The Golden Circle (2017) - The King of Sweden
 Vår tid är nu (2017, TV Series) - August Drugge (final appearance)

References

External links

Björn Granath - The Performers

1946 births
2017 deaths
Swedish male film actors
Eugene O'Neill Award winners
Litteris et Artibus recipients
People from Gothenburg
Swedish male stage actors
Swedish male television actors
20th-century Swedish male actors
21st-century Swedish male actors